John Buffum (born October 4, 1943 in Wallingford, Connecticut) is the most successful U.S. rally driver ever, winning 11 national titles and 117 national championship events.

From 1977 to 1980, when British Leyland dropped out of U.S. racing, he won both the SCCA ProRally series and the North America Rally Championships. In 1981, he competed with an Audi 80 and Peugeot 504, but they were not competitive compared to Rod Millen's factory Mazda RX-7 rally cars.

In addition to his North American schedule, Buffum cherry-picked rallies in Europe, where he became the first and still the only American to win a European Rally Championship event, taking the 1983 Sachs Rally in West Germany and the 1984 Cyprus Rally, both with Audi Quattro. He also ran the 1969 Monte Carlo Rally in a Porsche 911.  Buffum is the only driver in the world to compete in at least one World Rally Championship event in five continuous decades (1960's, 1970's, 1980's, 1990's and 2000).

He also helped restart the Mount Washington Hillclimb Auto Race in 1990 and served as Chief Steward of the hillclimb from 1990 to 2000, again in 2011 and again in 2017.

Since the late 1980s, Buffum has owned and managed Libra Racing based in Colchester, Vermont. He has been responsible for building cars for the Hyundai Factory rally programme in the US and has worked alongside Vermont Sports Car on their Subaru Factory programme as a consultant. In 2009, he built the first open class Mitsubishi Evolution X, to campaign in the Rally America national series and the Canadian Rally series.

In 2014, Buffum was elected to the Vermont Sports Hall of Fame.

References
Rally Racing News John Buffum biography. Retrieved December 31, 2004.

External links
Libra Racing, John Buffum's company.
JohnBuffum.com - John Buffum's homepage.
In Like a Lamb...Out LIke a Lion Champion co-driver and former National PRO Rally Manager, Tom Grimshaw, tells John Buffum's story and the course of rally racing in the United States.
2006 SCCA Hall of Fame Class Announced
Vermont Sports Hall of Fame Bio

1943 births
Living people
People from Wallingford, Connecticut
World Rally Championship drivers
American rally drivers
Trans-Am Series drivers
Racing drivers from Connecticut

Audi Sport drivers